Mountain View High School (MVHS) is the only public secondary school located in the city of Mountain View, in Stone County, Arkansas.

Academics 
The school is accredited by the Arkansas Department of Education (ADE). The assumed course of study for students is the ADE Smart Core curriculum, which requires students to complete at least 22 units of credit. Students complete regular (core and career focus) courses and exams and may select Advanced Placement (AP) coursework and exams that provide an opportunity for college credit prior to high school graduation.

Extracurricular activities 
The mascot of the school is the Yellowjacket.  The school colors are blue and gold.

Athletics
For 2012–14, the Mountain View Yellowjackets compete in the 3A 1 Conference as administered by the Arkansas Activities Association. The Yellowjackets participate in football, soccer, men's and women's basketball, baseball, softball, men's and women's golf, men's and women's tennis, wrestling, cheerleading, and men's and women's track and field.  The school also sponsors a women's dance team which won the 2008-2009 State Championship, as well as the 2010-2011 and 2015-2016 State Championships. In the past has fielded a swim team.

 Basketball: The girls' basketball team won the 3A state basketball championship in 2011 and in 2019.

References

External links
 

Public high schools in Arkansas
Schools in Stone County, Arkansas
Buildings and structures in Mountain View, Arkansas